This is a list of longwave radio broadcasters updated on February 28, 2023:

List of stations that have closed or are inactive

References

 
 :de:Langwellenrundfunk
 World Radio TV Handbook
 
 

Longwave broadcasters